Alrekstad (Norwegian: Kongsgården på Alrekstad, Old Norse: Álreksstaðir) was one of the largest Kongsgård estates on the west coast of Norway during the early Middle Ages.

History
Alrekstad was situated at the foot of Ulriken, the highest of the Seven Mountains (de syv fjell) that surround Bergen, Norway. King Harald Hairfair took residence there in the 10th century. Snorre mentions Alrekstad among the five farms where Harold Fairhair remained mostly in his later years.  After the Battle of Fitjar in 960, King Håkon the Good was on his way to Alrek, but died at Håkonshella in Laksevåg.

At times the estate was the home of King Eric Bloodaxe, Bloodaxe's children, and King Haakon I. Later King Olaf III, the founder of Bergen, ruled the city from Alrekstad for 26 years.
These early kings moved the court and the royal court to the royal residence. From these estates were ruled kingdom.

Alrekstad lost its importance when King Eystein I of Norway moved his seat to Holmen in Bergen, located within the city limits. The king's estate was later moved down closer to the sea when Håkonshallen was built. In 1277, King Magnus Lagabøte bequeathed Alrekstad to the Monastery of Nonneseter.

The parish of Aarstad existed for centuries before the creation of the municipality of Aarstad in 1838.  The municipality and parish of Aarstad (later spelled Årstad) was named after Alrekstad.

Etymology
According to the Norwegian Place Name Encyclopedia (Norsk Stadnamnleksikon)  the name Álreksstaðir is derived from the place name Ulriken. The name Ulriken probably came from Old Norse Alrekr, meaning the towering.

Presently
The name Alrekstad evolved into today's Årstad, the modern name of a borough of the city of Bergen. The location of Alrekstad – today referred to as "Årstadvollen" – is situated outside of the Årstad borough.  The original estate houses were probably placed where Haukeland Elementary School (Haukeland skole) is situated  today. The fjord below (today named Store Lunggårdsvann) was then called Alrekstad bay (Alrekstadvågen).

Norwegian author Gunnar Staalesen has announced plans to write a play centering on  Alrekstad. On 10 September 2000, a commemorative plaque was unveiled at the entrance to Årstad Alternative School, supported by Årstad congregation and Årstad schools.

Translation of the plaque

References

Other sources
 Bing, Just  Aarstads historie  (Bergens Historiske Forenings Skrifter. November 28, 1922)

Geography of Bergen
Viking Age populated places
Royal residences in Norway
Medieval Norway
History of Bergen
Harald Fairhair